Dhana may refer to:
Dhana, a census town in Sagar district in the state of Madhya Pradesh, India
 Dhana Nanda
Jebel Dhana, an airport in the United Arab Emirates
dhana, or dhana lilia, another word for coriander leaves
dhana, or dhania, another word for coriander seeds
Dhana Taprogge, lead vocalist for Taxi Doll